Gouk is a surname. Notable persons with that name include:

Chin Gouk, Malaysian pathologist
Jim Gouk (born 1946), Canadian politician

See also
Vouk